Salt Fat Acid Heat is an American cooking documentary television series starring Samin Nosrat. Based on her 2017 book of the same name, the four-part series premiered on Netflix on October 11, 2018.

The show and book's title comes from Nosrat's proposed four elements of successful cooking: salt, fat, acid, and heat. Each installment of the series focuses on a particular element, with Nosrat traveling to a different location to demonstrate how the element is used in local cuisine. In each episode, Nosrat has guides who walk her through their homeland's cuisine while she pulls out the lessons related to each fundamental element. The show is "part how-to guide for home cooks of all skill levels and part aspirational travelogue."

Episodes

Reception
The show has received positive reviews from critics. On the review aggregator Rotten Tomatoes, the series has a 100% approval rating based on nine reviews, with an average rating of 7.5 out of 10. Maura Judkis of The Washington Post called it "unlike any other food show on TV", particularly mentioning the high proportion of women and home cooks featured on the show. For Eater, Greg Morabito described Nosrat as "a charming host", and applauded her and director Caroline Suh for conceiving of a "completely new style of culinary TV show". Doreen St. Félix's review in The New Yorker ascribed the show's success to "Nosrat's uncommon earnestness on camera. St. Félix also described how the show gives viewers a feeling of nostalgia for something most people have not experienced: local, high-quality ingredients enjoyed in the beautiful vistas of their countries of origin.

History 
Nosrat began teaching cooking classes in 2007 and found it a very inefficient way of teaching. Even before she wrote the book the TV show is based on, she thought about TV as a great way to reach a wider audience. When recalling this moment, she said, "And after two or three classes, I was like, Man, if I had a TV show, I could get to so many people … Just like I had not seen a book that sets out to teach, I had not seen a show that really sets out to teach."

References

External links 
  on Netflix
 

Netflix original documentary television series
2018 American television series debuts
2018 American television series endings
2010s American cooking television series
English-language Netflix original programming
2010s American documentary television series
American travel television series
Television shows based on books
2010s travel television series